Danielle Chenard (December 12, 1957 – May 20, 1986) was a Canadian handball player who competed in the 1976 Summer Olympics. She was born in Montreal, Quebec.

She was part of the Canadian handball team, which finished sixth in the Olympic tournament. She played all five matches.

References
Danielle Chenard's profile at Sports Reference.com

1957 births
1986 deaths
Canadian female handball players
Olympic handball players of Canada
Handball players at the 1976 Summer Olympics
Sportspeople from Montreal
French Quebecers